The A7 is a planned Motorway to link the city of Paphos with Polis, a small town in the north west of the island.

Overview 

This motorway is one of the oldest demands of locals, due to number of accidents happened on the B7 road (current route towards Polis), and due to the constant heavy traffic on it.  This is the first motorway project in Cyprus, which is going to be performed through the Design, Build, Finance and Operate method (DBFO).  After several bureaucratic delays, plans are completed, and offers were made from 5 construction consortia.  Although at first  it was decided that the consortium called "Kinyras" was the preferred  bidder, Kinyras claiming rising costs due to the ongoing financial crisis raising its financial demands, hence putting the whole project in hiatus. Following government's refusal to pay more for an already expensive project, talks moved to the second preferred bidder the Austrian-Cypriot consortium "Strabag-Nemesis". If an agreement is reached construction can commence as soon as the first quarter of 2011 with a 2015 deadline.

Currently, the project is on hold, although the Government announced they are reassessing the design (August 2013)

Project Details

The A7 will be the most expensive road project ever being held by the Republic of Cyprus, with a 447 million Euros price tag. Plans include 3 tunnels 7 bridges, 8 grade separated interchanges and 25 underpasses. The scheme is projected to take 4,5 years to complete and it will branch off the A6 right after the Anatoliko Industrial zone exit and bear North. It will travel East of Armou and Marathounta, west of "Minthis Hills" Golf Resort, and Stroumpi where it will meet the current B7 road and follow the current path. Here on the Motorway will narrow down to two lanes until its terminus at Polis.

See also 
 A1 motorway (Cyprus)
 A2 motorway (Cyprus)
 A4 motorway (Cyprus)
 A5 motorway (Cyprus)
 A6 motorway (Cyprus)
 A9 motorway (Cyprus)
 A22 motorway (Cyprus)

References 

Motorways and roads in Cyprus
Limited-access roads
Proposed roads
Proposed transport infrastructure in Cyprus